The compilation album, Always, by Willie Nelson was one of the best-selling albums of 1980 and 1981 in Australia and New Zealand. In Australia, it peaked at No. 4 and in New Zealand at No. 7.

Track listing 
Always
Danny Boy
On The Road Again
My Heroes Have Always Been Cowboys
Help Me Make It Through The Night
Far Away Places
Tenderly
Blue Eyes Crying In The Rain
That Lucky Old Sun
Red Headed Stranger
Because Of You
One For My Baby And One More For The Road

Certifications

References 

1980 compilation albums
Willie Nelson compilation albums